Nedim Ökmen (1908–1967) was a Turkish economist and politician who held various cabinet posts during the premiership of Adnan Menderes in the 1950s.

Early life and education
Ökmen was born in Kilis in 1908. After completing his primary education in his hometown he attended Istanbul High School and graduated in 1927. He received a degree from the Faculty of Political Sciences of Istanbul University. In 1938 he was sent to France for inspection training.

Career
Following his graduation from Istanbul University Ökmen was employed at the Ministry of Finance as an assistant financial inspector. After returning to Turkey in 1933 he continued to work at the ministry and became a financial inspector in 1935. He began to serve as a chief inspector from 1945. His term ended in 1950 when he started his political career being a member of the Democrat Party. He was elected as a deputy from Maraş in the general election held on 14 May 1950. Ökmen was also elected to the Parliament in the general elections in 1954 and 1957 from Gaziantep.

Cabinet posts
Ökmen was appointed minister of agriculture to the second cabinet of Prime Minister Adnan Menderes on 10 March 1951 and was in office until 9 December 1954. Ökmen held the same post in the next cabinet between 1954 and 1955. Then he was minister of finance for one year from 1955 to 1956. He resigned from the post because of the conflicts with Menderes. Ökmen was again appointed minister of agriculture on 26 December 1957 and was in office until 27 May 1960 when the government was overthrown by a military coup.

Later years and death
Ökmen was arrested along with other Democrat Party politicians following the coup. He was tried by the Supreme Court of Justice in Yassıada and sentenced to twenty years in prison. Ökmen was found guilty due to the cases about the sale of an Afghan hound which had been given by the Afghan King to President Celal Bayar as a gift and about the illegal sale of a land owned by his wife. Due to health problems, he was released from prison on 22 September 1964.

Ökmen died in Istanbul on 2 February 1967.

References

20th-century Turkish economists
1908 births
1967 deaths
Democrat Party (Turkey, 1946–1961) politicians
Deputies of Gaziantep
Deputies of Kahramanmaraş
Agriculture ministers of Turkey
Istanbul University alumni
Ministers of Finance of Turkey
Members of the 20th government of Turkey
Members of the 21st government of Turkey
Members of the 23rd government of Turkey
Members of the 9th Parliament of Turkey
Members of the 10th Parliament of Turkey
Members of the 11th Parliament of Turkey
People from Kilis
Politicians arrested in Turkey
Turkish prisoners and detainees
Members of the 22nd government of Turkey